Protula is a genus of marine polychaete worms in the family Serpulidae.

Subgenera
This genus has two subgenera:
Protula (Hydroides)
Protula (Protulopsis)

Species
The following species are classified in this genus:
Protula alba Benedict, 1887
Protula alberti Fauvel, 1909
Protula americana McIntosh, 1885
Protula anomala Day, 1955
Protula antennata Ehlers, 1887
Protula apomatoides (Uchida, 1978)
Protula atypha Bush, 1905
Protula balboensis Monro, 1933
Protula bispiralis (Savigny, 1822)
Protula canavarii Roverto, 1899 †
Protula diomedeae Benedict, 1887
Protula extensa Solander in Brander, 1766
Protula intestinum (Lamarck, 1818)
Protula longiseta Schmarda, 1861
Protula media Stimpson, 1854
Protula pacifica Pixell, 1912
Protula palliata (Willey, 1905)
Protula planianica Ziegler, 1984 †
Protula submedia Augener, 1906
Protula superba Moore, 1909
Protula tubularia (Montagu, 1803)
Protula vincenti Rovereto, 1904
Protula xeniolum Rovereto, 1904

Synonyms
The following genera are synonyms of Protula:
Ehlerprotula Uchida, 1978 (junior synonym)
Lemintina Risso, 1826 (subjective synonym)
Longitubus Howell, 1943 † (subjective synonym)
Membranopsis Bush, 1910 (subjective synonym)
Paraprotula Uchida, 1978 (junior synonym)
Peotula Sun, 1998
Protula (Philippiprotula) Uchida, 1978 (subgenus not recognized any longer)
Protula (Protula) Risso, 1826 (subgenus not longer recognised)
Protula (Psygmobranchus) Philippi, 1844 (subgenus not recognised any longer)
Protulopsis Saint-Joseph, 1894 (synonym)
Psygmobranchus Philippi, 1844 (junior synonym)
Salmacinopsis Bush, 1910
Serpula (Helena) Castelnau
Serpula (Spiramella)
Spiramella Blainville, 1828 (junior synonym)

References

Serpulidae